Ajuga reptans is commonly known as bugle, blue bugle, bugleherb, bugleweed, carpetweed, carpet bugleweed, and common bugle, and traditionally but less commonly as St. Lawrence plant. It is an herbaceous flowering plant in the mint family Lamiaceae, native to Europe. It is invasive in parts of North America. It is also a component of purple moor grass and rush pastures, a Biodiversity Action Plan habitat in the United Kingdom.

Ajuga reptans is a dense spreading groundcover with dark green leaves with purple highlights. The flowers are frequently visited by flies, such as Rhingia campestris.

Description
The stems are square in cross-section with hairs on two sides. The plant has runners that spread across the surface of the ground. The purplish-green, stalked leaves are in opposite pairs. The leaf blades are hairless and are elliptical or ovate with a rounded tip and shallowly rounded teeth on the margin. The inflorescence forms a dense raceme composed of whorls of blue flowers, each with dark veins on the lower lip. The upper lip of each flower is short and flat with a smooth edge, and the lower lip is three-lobed, the central lobe being the largest, flat with a notched tip. There are four stamens, two long and two short, which are longer than the corolla and are attached to the tube. The ovary is superior and the fruit is a schizocarp with four chambers.

Habitat
Woods and rough pastures.

Distribution
Common in Ireland, and throughout Great Britain.

Pollination
The species is monoecious, with male and female flowers on the same plant. Pollination is by bees or Lepidoptera (moths and butterflies).

Uses 

Grown as a garden plant it provides useful groundcover. Numerous cultivars have been selected, of which 'Catlin's Giant' has gained the Royal Horticultural Society's Award of Garden Merit.

Bugle is also known as "carpenter's herb" for its supposed ability to stem bleeding.

Bugle is a primary nectar source of the pearl-bordered fritillary and the small pearl-bordered fritillary.  It is a secondary nectar source of the brimstone, chequered skipper, common blue, cryptic wood white, dingy skipper, Duke of Burgundy, green-veined white, grizzled skipper, heath fritillary, holly blue, large blue, large skipper, large white, marsh fritillary, orange-tip, painted lady, small white, and wood white butterflies.

Ajuga reptans herb has been used in traditional Austrian medicine internally as a tea for the treatment of disorders related to the respiratory tract.

References

 
 Bracken for Butterflies leaflet by Butterfly Conservation

External links 

 Ohio State University: Ajuga reptans
 Plants For A Future: Ajuga reptans
 USDA Plants Profile: Ajuga reptans
 Plants For A Future - Ajuga reptans L

reptans
Flora of Europe
Garden plants of Europe
Groundcovers
Medicinal plants of Europe
Plants described in 1753
Taxa named by Carl Linnaeus